Chang Hao (born 28 April 1997) is a Chinese synchronised swimmer. She won a gold medal (China's first ever) and a silver medal at the 2017 World Aquatics Championships. She also won 4 silver medals at the 2016 Asian Swimming Championships.

References
集体自由组合高分加冕 中国花游首夺世锦赛冠军！
常昊

Living people
Chinese synchronized swimmers
1997 births
World Aquatics Championships medalists in synchronised swimming
Synchronized swimmers at the 2017 World Aquatics Championships
Artistic swimmers at the 2022 World Aquatics Championships
Synchronized swimmers from Beijing
Asian Games gold medalists for China
Medalists at the 2018 Asian Games
Artistic swimmers at the 2018 Asian Games
Asian Games medalists in artistic swimming